Hillsdale may refer to:

Places 
In Australia:
 Hillsdale, New South Wales, a suburb of Sydney

In Canada:
Hillsdale (Nepean), a neighbourhood of Nepean, Ontario
Hillsdale, Ontario, a village about 90 minutes north of Toronto
Rural Municipality of Hillsdale No. 440, a rural municipality in Saskatchewan

In the United States:
 Hillsdale, Illinois
 Hillsdale, Indiana, a village in Vermillion County
 Hillsdale, Vanderburgh County, Indiana
 Hillsdale, Michigan
 Hillsdale Township, Michigan
 Hillsdale, Missouri
 Hillsdale, New Jersey in Bergen County
 Hillsdale, Monmouth County, New Jersey
 Hillsdale, New York
 Hillsdale, North Carolina
 Hillsdale, Oklahoma
 Hillsdale, Portland, Oregon, a neighborhood
 Hillsdale, Pennsylvania
 Hillsdale, Tennessee
 Hillsdale, Utah
 Hillsdale, West Virginia
 Hillsdale, Wisconsin
 Hillsdale, Wyoming

Rail stations

Hillsdale (NJT station), a railroad station in the New Jersey borough, along the Pascack Valley Line
Hillsdale (Caltrain station), a railroad station in San Mateo, California
Hillsdale (NYCRR station), a former railroad station in the New York town of the same name

Other topics
 Hillsdale (horse), an American Thoroughbred racehorse
 Hillsdale College in Hillsdale, Michigan
 Hillsdale Academy, operated by Hillsdale College
 Hillsdale Free Will Baptist College, Moore, Oklahoma
 Hillsdale High School (disambiguation), several
 Hillsdale Lake, Kansas
 Seven Hills School (Cincinnati, Ohio), which includes the Hillsdale campus